Ray Metcalfe (born August 29, 1950) is a politician and political activist in Alaska. Metcalfe has served in the Alaska House of Representatives as a Republican between 1979 and 1983, been active as an activist with the Republican Moderate Party founded by himself, and later became a Democrat, running unsuccessfully for the United States Senate in 2016.

Personal life
Ray Metcalfe was born on the Crow Indian Reservation in Montana, where he lived until he left home at the age of 15. He spent the next few years hitchhiking around the country, attending high schools in multiple cities and states until graduating from Billings Senior High School in Billings, Montana in 1969. He then hitchhiked to Alaska, arriving June 5, 1969 with a bedroll, a backpack and $52.00 in his pocket.

His life in Alaska alternated between Alaska's oil fields and college, studying business and history until he opened Metcalfe Real Estate Company in 1976, which he operates to this day.

Political career
Metcalfe was twice elected to the Alaska House of Representatives as a Republican. He formed the Republican Moderate Party of Alaska in 1986, to oppose the religious right who he felt had invaded and taken over the Republican Party, and ran for the Alaska House again attempting to beat the incumbent Republican he had lost his former seat to in 1982. Shortly after Metcalfe formed the RMP, the leaders of the Republican Party sued him for forming a group using the term "Republican" without their permission. Metcalfe won in Superior Court and the Republican Party did not appeal. The Superior Court had declared Metcalfe to be a "Public Litigant," "litigating in the public interest in defense of free speech for all." Consequently, under Alaska's court rules, the new leaders of the Republican Party were ordered to pay all Metcalfe's attorney fees. His political runs for the state House and the governor's office were unsuccessful but he received over 6% of the vote in the 1998 gubernatorial election, when the Republican vote had been split between three unsuccessful Republican candidates.

In 2006, Metcalfe ran as a Democrat for the sole U.S. House seat from Alaska, coming in second to Diane E. Benson by receiving 34% of the vote in the Democratic primary. In 2008 the Republican Moderate Party lost its party status and remained as a political group, while the Citizens For Ethical Government Inc., a non profit political watchdog group, was created. Metcalfe again declared he was running as a Democrat, this time for the US Senate seat held by Ted Stevens, but he lost in the 2008 Democratic primary. In 2016, Metcalfe lost his bid to become regional Co-Chair of the Anchorage branch of the Alaska Democratic Party to Joshua Spring by a two to one margin.

In the August 16, 2016 primary, Metcalfe won the Democratic nomination to oppose Republican U.S. Senator Lisa Murkowski. On November 8, 2016 he placed fourth in the general election behind Murkowski (44%), Libertarian Joe Miller (30%), and Independent Margaret Stock (14%). Metcalfe received 11% of the vote.

See also 
United States Senate election in Alaska, 2008
United States Senate election in Alaska, 2016

References

External links
 Ray Metcalfe for US Senate 2016 on Facebook
 Citizens for Ethical Government Inc. official website
 
 Follow the Money — Ray Metcalf
 2002 2000 House campaign contributions
 1998 Governor/Lieutenant Governor campaign contributions
 Ray Metcalfe at 100 Years of Alaska's Legislature

1950 births
20th-century American politicians
21st-century American politicians
Alaska Democrats
Alaska Republicans
American real estate businesspeople
Businesspeople from Anchorage, Alaska
Candidates in the 2006 United States elections
Candidates in the 2008 United States elections
Candidates in the 2016 United States Senate elections
Living people
Members of the Alaska House of Representatives
Politicians from Anchorage, Alaska
Politicians from Billings, Montana
Republican Moderate Party of Alaska politicians
State political party chairs of Alaska